Sarah Daniels may refer to:
 Sarah Daniels (playwright)
 Sarah Daniels (actress)
 Sarah Daniels, host of the Canadian reality television series Urban Suburban